The Law Officers Act 1997 is an Act of Parliament which allowed the Attorney General for England and Wales and for Northern Ireland to delegate powers to the Solicitor General for England and Wales. Previously, the Solicitor General was separately and explicitly granted some of the same powers of the Attorney General. This Act effectively made the Solicitor General an agent of the Attorney General.

Overview

Section 1
This section allows the Solicitor General to do things in the name of the Attorney General, effectively allowing them to delegate powers to the Solicitor General.

Section 2
This section effectively extends Section 1's provisions to Northern Ireland. Since 2010, the Attorney General for England and Wales is the Advocate General for Northern Ireland, and these provisions have been exercised by them.

Section 3
This section enacts certain repeals which explicitly granted the Solicitor General powers of the Attorney General, and sets a date for the Act to commence.

See also
 Attorney General for England and Wales
 Advocate General for Northern Ireland
 Solicitor General for England and Wales
 Law of the United Kingdom

References

External links
 Text of the Act as amended

United Kingdom Acts of Parliament 1997
Law Officers of the Crown in the United Kingdom
1997 in British law